The 1956 Murray River flood involved the rising of waters in the Murray River and flooding of many towns in New South Wales, Victoria and South Australia. The flood was and still is considered the biggest flood in the recorded history of the Murray and described as "the greatest catastrophe in South Australia's history", although few lives were lost.

The flood occurred due to higher than average rainfalls in Western Queensland and heavy rains in the proceeding three months in the Murray-Darling basin. Inflow into South Australia peaked at 341 gigalitres per day, the highest on record; the next highest on record is 220 gigalitres per day in 1931.

From upstream to downstream, flooding occurred in the towns of Wentworth in New South Wales; Colignan, Iraak, Mildura, Nangiloc, and Red Cliffs in Victoria; and many South Australia towns including Renmark, Mannum and Murray Bridge.

As a result of the flood, the Menindee Lakes were constructed to store high flows from the Darling River.

Impact

Mildura, Victoria

In 2006, historic flood markers were erected at Apex Park and the lawns of the Mildura Rowing Club at Mildura, indicating the height the river reached in 1956. Additional markers were to be erected at various locations along the river from Wentworth to Colignan.

Wentworth, New South Wales
The town of Wentworth, located on the junction of the Darling and Murray Rivers, erected a statue in 1959 in honour of the Fergie TE20 tractor, responsible for helping to erect a levee around the town which kept floodwaters at bay for months. A tractor rally is also held every five years to celebrate the Fergie.

Mannum, South Australia

Hotels in the main street of Mannum operated their bars from the second floor with boats tying up to the balcony. The flood water broke the levee bank on 24 August, and had not fully receded until Christmas.

Several towns in South Australia have depth markers showing how high the floodwaters rose.

In popular culture
Author Philip Pullman used his childhood memories of being taken to see the flood as a basis for his 2017 fantasy novel La Belle Sauvage.

References

External links
1956 River Murray Flood at State Library of South Australia

1956 Flood at Culture Victoria

Murray River Flood
Murray River flood
Murray River flood
Murray River Flood
Flood, 1956
Flood, 1956
Murray River Flood
Murray River Flood
Murray River Flood
Murray River Flood
1956 disasters in Australia